Rivière-Verte is a civil parish in Madawaska County, New Brunswick, Canada.

For governance purposes it is divided between the city of Edmundston, the town of Vallée-des-Rivières, and the Northwest rural district, all of which are members of the Northwest Regional Service Commission.

Before the 2023 governance reforms, the village of Rivière-Verte included what is now part of Edmundston, while the parish outside the village formed the local service district of the parish of Rivière-Verte.

Origin of name
The parish probably takes its name from the Green River, a tributary of the Saint John River, which takes its name from the colour of its water.

History
Rivière-Verte was erected in 1920 from Saint-Basile Parish.

Boundaries
Rivière-Verte Parish is bounded:

on the northeast, beginning on the Restigouche County line at the prolongation of the northwestern line of a grant to John Hart on the Saint John River, then running southeasterly about 24 kilometres to the northwestern line of the Third Tract granted to the New Brunswick Railway Company;
on the southeast, beginning on the county line, then running southwesterly along the Third Tract to its westernmost corner, then southeasterly along southwestern line of the Third Tract to the prolongation of the southeastern line of a grant to Louis E. Roy in Tier Nine of the Martin Settlement North, then southwesterly along the prolongation, the Roy grant, and straight along grant lines across Tiers Eight and Seven to Montagne-de-la-Croix Road, then northwesterly along the road about 550 metres to the northernmost corner of a grant to Théodule Clavette in Tier Six of Martin Settlement North, then southwesterly to the southernmost corner of the Clavette grant, then northwesterly about 1.3 kilometres along Tier Six to the prolongation of the southeastern line of Lot I in a five-lot grant to John M. Steeves on the Quisibis River, then southwesterly along Lot I to the Quisibis, then upstream about 50 metres, then southwesterly along the southeastern line of a grant to Amable Thibaudeau, then southwesterly along the Thibaudeau grant to the northernmost corner of a grant to Dennis Bourgoin, then southwesterly, with a bend slightly more southerly, along the Bourgoin grant to the rear line of grants on the Saint John River, then southeasterly about 100 metres to the easternmost corner of a grant to Francis Gaudin, then southwesterly along the Gaudin grant and its prolongation the Saint John;
on the southwest by international border within the Saint John River;
on the northwest, beginning in the Saint John on the prolongation of the northwestern line of a grant to John Vassour, about 1.1 kilometres upriver from Lavoie Road, then running northeasterly along the Vassour grant to the rear line of the Saint John River tier, then northwesterly about 475 metres to the westernmost corner of a grant to J. Legasse and Others, then northeasterly along the northwestern line of the Legasse grant to the Green River, then across the river and northeasterly along the northwestern line of a grant to Edward Thibaudeau in Tier One north of the Green River to the rear line of Tier One, then northwesterly about 200 metres to the southernmost corner of a Tier Two grant to Thomas Lavoie, then northeasterly in a straight line along the northwestern line of the Lavoie grant and grants in Tiers Three and Four to the rear line of Tier Four, then northwesterly along Tier Four and its prolongation to the prolongation of the Hart grant;
on the northwest by the prolongation of the Hart grant, beginning about 1.8 kilometres northeast of Green River and running northeasterly to the county line.

Communities
Communities at least partly within the parish. bold indicates an incorporated municipality

 Beardsley Depot
 Davis Mill
 Montagne-de-la-Croix
 Montagne-des-Roy
 Montagne-des-Therrien
 Rivière-Verte

Bodies of water
Bodies of water at least partly in the parish.

 Gounamitz River
 Little Main Restigouche River
 Quisibis River
 Saint John River
 Branche à Charles
 Caribou Branch
 Lake Branch
 Main Branch
 Upper Main Branch
 Charles Fork
 Knox Fork
 Burgess Lake
 North Quisibis Lake

Other notable places
Parks, historic sites, and other noteworthy places at least partly in the parish.
 McCoy Brook Protected Natural Area
 Quisibis Mountain Protected Natural Area
 Quisibis River Protected Natural Area

Demographics
Parish population total does not include village of Rivière-Verte

Population

Language

See also
List of parishes in New Brunswick

Notes

References

Local service districts of Madawaska County, New Brunswick
Parishes of Madawaska County, New Brunswick